Kitty Girls was a Filipino girl group formed in the Philippines in April 2007. Originally a quintet, the group consisted of Jocelyn Oxlade, Ayanna Oliva, Veronica Scott, Nicole Deen and Tanya Yuquimpo. In 2010, the group relaunched as a trio with Khai Lim joining Oxlade and Oliva.

History

Formation and debut album 
In 2007, under the guidance of Cecille Carpio of Elan Models International and Jose Felix Dingcong of JLD Management, the Kitty Girls were signed to Star Records. The original line up, consisting of Jocelyn Oxlade, Ayanna Oliva, Veronica Scott, Tanya Yuquimpo and Nicole Deen, would open up for Akon in the Akon—Live in Manila concert in November and would feature in the cover of FHM Philippines' December 2007 issue.

In January 2008, the group launched their self-titled debut album Kitty Girls. The single "K.I.T.T.Y.". was launched and performed live by the group in ABS-CBN's Sunday variety show ASAP.

On February 15, 2008, the Kitty Girls staged their first major concert dubbed One purr...fect Kitty Night. The same year, the group would become official Philippine endorsers of Sharp televisions.

Line up change, relaunch and new single 

Over time the group would become a trio, with Oxlade, Oliva and Scott, in TV appearances.

In June 2010, the group was relaunched in The Fort in Taguig, with Khai Lim joining Oxlade and Oliva, and sang live for the first time their new single "We On Fire"—which debuted on DWFM U92 a week earlier. In an interview with Nelson Canlas for 24 Oras' "Chikka Minute" segment, Oxlade revealed that the other girls left the group to go back to their respective countries and some to go back to their studies.

A year later, the trio would tour Malaysia for Pernod Ricard's Ambassadeurs De La Marques Presents Stellar.

TV appearances

Discography

Studio albums

Singles

Other appearances

Compilation appearances

References

External links 
 The Kitty Girls Debut Album

Filipino girl groups
Filipino pop music groups
Star Magic
Musical groups established in 2007
Musical groups disestablished in 2013
Musical groups from Metro Manila